OFAH may refer to:

 Only Fools and Horses, a British television sitcom
 The Ontario Federation of Anglers and Hunters, a Canadian conservation organisation